This list of the Mesozoic life of Colorado contains the various prehistoric life-forms whose fossilized remains have been reported from within the US state of Colorado and are between 252.17 and 66 million years of age.

A

 †Acanthichnus – tentative report
 Acila
 †Acila chicotana
 Acmaea
 †Acmaea genettae – type locality for species
  †Adocus
  †Albanerpeton
 †Albanerpeton nexuosus
  †Albertosaurus – tentative report
 †Aletridelphys
 †Aletridelphys hatcheri
 †Allantodiopsis
 †Allantodiopsis erosa
 †Allantodiopsis JC018 – informal
  †Allosaurus – type locality for genus
 †Allosaurus fragilis – type locality for species
 †Allosaurus lucasi – type locality for species
 †Amblotherium – type locality for genus
 †Amblotherium gracilis
 Amia
 †Amphicoelias – type locality for genus
 †Amphicoelias altus – type locality for species
  †Amphicotylus
 †Amphicotylus lucasii – type locality for species
 †Amplovalvata
 †Amplovalvata scabrida
 †Anaklinoceras
 †Anaklinoceras minutum – type locality for species
 †Anaklinoceras reflexum
 †Anisoceras
 †Anisoceras plicatilis
 †Anisomyon
 †Anisomyon centrale
 †Anomia
 †Anomia subquadrata
 †Anomia tellinoides
  †Anomoepus – tentative report
 †Apateodus
 †Apatopus
 †Apatosaurus – type locality for genus
 †Apatosaurus ajax – type locality for species
 †Apatosaurus laticollis – type locality for species. Junior synonym of A. louisae.
 †Apatosaurus louisae
 †Arcellites
 †Arcellites disciformis
 †Archaeolamna
 †Archaeolamna kopingensis
 †Arenicolites
 Aspideretes
 †Aspideretes vagans – type locality for species
 †Aspideretoides
 Astarte
  †Atlantosaurus
 †Atlantosaurus immanis – type locality for species
 †Axonoceras
 †Axonoceras compressum

B

 †Baculites
 †Baculites aquilaensis
 †Baculites asper
 †Baculites clinolobatus – type locality for species
 †Baculites codyensis
 †Baculites compressus
 †Baculites cuneatus
 †Baculites grandis
 †Baculites haresi
 †Baculites mclearni
 †Baculites meeki – type locality for species
 †Baculites reesidei
  †Barosaurus
 †Basilemys
 †Basilemys sinuosa – or unidentified comparable form
 †Behuninia
 †Behuninia provoensis
 †Bellifusus
 †Bison
 †Bison alticornis – type locality for species
 †Borealosuchus
 †Borealosuchus sternbergii
  †Brachauchenius – or unidentified comparable form
  †Brachiosaurus – type locality for genus
 †Brachiosaurus altithorax – type locality for species
 †Brachychampsa
 †Brachychampsa montana
 †Brachychirotherium
 †Brachyphyllum
 †Brachyphyllum rechtenii – type locality for species
  †Brontosaurus
 †Brontosaurus excelsus
 †Brontosaurus yahnahpin

C

  †Calycoceras
 †Calycoceras canitaurinum
 †Calycoceras naviculare
  †Camarasaurus – type locality for genus
 †Camarasaurus agilis – type locality for species
 †Camarasaurus grandis
 †Camarasaurus lewisi
 †Camarasaurus supremus – type locality for species
  †Camptosaurus – type locality for genus
 †Camptosaurus dispar – type locality for species
  Carcharias
 †Carcharias amonensis
 †Carcharias saskatchewanensis
 †Carcharias tenuiplicatus
 †Caririchnium
 †Caririchnium leonardii – type locality for species
 †Caririchnium leonaridii
 †Cataceramus
 †Cataceramus gladbeckensis
 †Cedrobaena
 †Cedrobaena brinkman
  †Ceratodus – type locality for genus
 †Ceratodus felchi – type locality for species
 †Ceratodus guentheri – type locality for species
  †Ceratosaurus – type locality for genus
 †Ceratosaurus nasicornis – type locality for species
 Cerithiopsis
  †Champsosaurus
 Chara
 †Chelonipus
  †Chinlea
 †Chinlea sorenseni
 †Chinlestegophis – type locality for genus
 †Chinlestegophis jenkinsi – type locality for species
 †Chirotherium
 †Chirotherium lulli
  †Cimolichthys
 †Cimolichthys nepaholica
 †Cimolodon – or unidentified comparable form
  †Cimolomys
 †Cionichthys
 †Cionichthys dunklei
 †Cionodon – type locality for genus
 †Cionodon arctatus – type locality for species
 †Cirroceras
 †Cirroceras conradi
 †Cladoceramus
 †Cladoceramus undulatoplicatus
  †Clidastes
 †Clioscaphites
 †Clioscaphites choteauensis
 †Clioscaphites saxitonianus
 †Clioscaphites vermiformis
 †Coahuilites
 †Coahuilites sheltoni
 †Cochlichnus
 †Codellaster – type locality for genus
 †Codellaster keepersae – type locality for species
 †Coelophysis – tentative report
  †Coelurus
 †Coelurus fragilis
 †Compsemys
 †Compsemys victa
 †Coniasaurus
 †Coniasaurus crassidens
 Corbula
 †Corydalites – type locality for genus
 †Corydalites fecundum – type locality for species
 Crassatella
 †Crassatella franzeseii
 †Cremnoceramus
 †Cremnoceramus deformis
 †Crenella
 †Creonella
 †Creonella triplicata
 †Cretodus
 †Cretodus semiplicatus
 †Cretolamna
 †Cretolamna appendiculata
 †Cretomanta
 †Cretomanta canadensis
  †Cretoxyrhina
 †Cretoxyrhina mantelli
 Cucullaea
 †Cucullaea nebrascensis
 Cuspidaria
 †Cuspidaria ventricosa
 †Czekanowskia
 †Czekanowskia turneri – tentative report

D

 †Diablophis
 †Diablophis gilmorei – type locality for species
  †Didymoceras
 †Didymoceras aurarium – type locality for species
 †Didymoceras cheyennense
 †Didymoceras draconis
 †Didymoceras stevensoni
 †Dinehichnus
 †Dinehichnus socialis
 †Dinochelys
 †Dinochelys whitei
  †Diplodocus – type locality for genus
 †Diplodocus lacustris – type locality for species
 †Diplodocus longus – type locality for species
 Diplodonta
 †Diplodonta davisi
 †Diplosaurus
 †Diplosaurus felix – type locality for species
 Discinisca
 †Discoscaphites
 †Discoscaphites conradi
 †Docodon
 †Docodon apoxys – type locality for species
 †Dorsetisaurus
  †Dorsetochelys
 †Dorsetochelys buzzops – type locality for species
 †Drepanocheilus
 †Drepanocheilus evansi
 †Drepanocheilus nebrascensis
 †Drepanocheilus obesus
 †Dryophyllum
 †Dryophyllum tennesseensis
 †Dryosaurus
 †Dryosaurus altus

E

  †Edmontonia
  †Edmontosaurus
 †Edmontosaurus regalis – type locality for species
 Eilenodon – type locality for genus
 †Eilenodon robustus – type locality for species
 †Elopopsis
  †Enchodus
 †Enchodus gladiolus – or unidentified comparable form
 †Enchodus shumardi – or unidentified comparable form
 †Entolium
 †Eoacteon
 †Eoacteon sublinearis
 †Eomunidopsis
 †Eomunidopsis cobbani – type locality for species
 †Eosauropus
 †Eosauropus cimarronensis
 †Eosauropus cimmaronensis
  †Equisetum
 †Equisetum burchardtii – or unidentified comparable form
 †Etea
 †Etea peasei
 †Eubrontes
 †Eubrontes giganteus
 †Eucalycoceras
 †Eucalycoceras pentagonum
 †Euomphaloceras
 †Euomphaloceras septemseriatum
 †Eutrephoceras
 †Eutrephoceras dekayi
 †Eutretauranosuchus – type locality for genus
 †Eutretauranosuchus delfsi – type locality for species
 †Exiteloceras
 †Exiteloceras jenneyi
 †Exogyra
 †Exogyra boveyensis – or unidentified related form

F

  †Fagesia
 Ficus
 †Ficus planicostata
 †Forresteria
 †Forresteria hobsoni – type locality for species
 †Fruitachampsa – type locality for genus
 †Fruitachampsa callisoni – type locality for species
 †Fruitadens – type locality for genus
 †Fruitadens haagarorum – type locality for species
 †Fruitafossor – type locality for genus
 †Fruitafossor windscheffeli – type locality for species

G

  †Galeamopus
 †Galeamopus pabsti
 †Glirodon
 †Glirodon grandis
  †Glyptops
 †Glyptops plicatulus – type locality for species
  †Goniopholis
 †Goniopholis felchi – type locality for species
 †Grallator
 †Grallator cursorius
 †Grallator tenuis
 †Gryphaeostrea
 †Gwyneddichnium
 †Gypsonictops
 †Gyroides

H

  †Hallopus
 †Hallopus victor – type locality for species
  †Haplocanthosaurus – type locality for genus
 †Haplocanthosaurus delfsi – type locality for species
 †Haplocanthosaurus priscus – type locality for species
 †Harduinia
 †Harduinia stantoni
 †Harduinia taylori
 †Haresiceras
 †Haresiceras placentiforme
 †Helopanoplia
 †Helopanoplia distincta – or unidentified comparable form
 †Hemicalypterus
 †Hermanophyton
  †Herrickiceras
 †Herrickiceras costatus
 †Holaster
 †Holaster feralis – type locality for species
 †Homolopsis
 †Hoploscaphites
 †Hoploscaphites birkelundae
 †Hoploscaphites landesi
 †Hoploscaphites macer
 †Hoploscaphites nicolletii
 †Hulettia – report made of unidentified related form or using admittedly obsolete nomenclature
 †Hulettia hawesi – type locality for species
 †Hypsirophus – type locality for genus
 †Hypsirophus discurus – type locality for species

I

  †Ichthyodectes
 †Ignotornis – type locality for genus
 †Ignotornis mcconnelli – type locality for species
  †Inoceramus
 †Inoceramus altus
 †Inoceramus altusiformis
 †Inoceramus anomalus
 †Inoceramus arnoldi
 †Inoceramus balticus
 †Inoceramus brancoiformis
 †Inoceramus bueltenensis
 †Inoceramus cordiformis
 †Inoceramus crippsi – or unidentified related form
 †Inoceramus deformis
 †Inoceramus erectus
 †Inoceramus flavus
 †Inoceramus grandis
 †Inoceramus longealatus
 †Inoceramus muelleri - or unidentified loosely related form
 †Inoceramus oblongus
 †Inoceramus pictus
 †Inoceramus prefragilis
 †Inoceramus rutherfordi – or unidentified comparable form
 †Inoceramus tenuistriatus – tentative report
 †Ischyrhiza
 †Ischyrhiza avonicola – or unidentified comparable form

J

  †Jeletzkytes
 †Jeletzkytes brevis
 †Jeletzkytes dorfi
 †Jeletzkytes nodosus
 †Jensensispermum
 †Jensensispermum redmondii
 Jupiteria
 †Jupiteria scitula

K

 †Kepodactylus – type locality for genus
 †Kepodactylus insperatus – type locality for species

L

 †Laosaurus – report made of unidentified related form or using admittedly obsolete nomenclature
 Laternula
  Lepisosteus – tentative report
 †Lepisosteus occidentalis
 †Leptalestes – tentative report
 †Leptalestes cooki
  †Leptolepis – or unidentified comparable form
 †Lewyites
 †Lewyites oronensis
 Lima
 †Lima janetae – type locality for species
 †Lingula
 †Lioestheria
 †Lioestheria tendagurensis – or unidentified comparable form
 †Lisserpeton
 †Lisserpeton bairdi
 †Lonchidion
 †Lonchidion selachos
 †Lucina
 †Lyropecten

M

  †Macelognathus
 †Macelognathus vagans
 †Magadiceramus
 †Magadiceramus complicatus
 †Magadiceramus crenelatus
 †Magadiceramus soukupi - or unidentified loosely related form
 †Magadiceramus subquadratus
 †Magnoavipes
 †Magnoavipes caneeri – type locality for species
 †Marmarthia – or unidentified comparable form
 †Marmarthia pearsonii
   †Marshosaurus – or unidentified comparable form
  †Meniscoessus
 †Meniscoessus collomensis – type locality for species
 †Meniscoessus conquistus
 †Meniscoessus robustus – or unidentified comparable form
 †Mesadactylus – type locality for genus
 †Mesadactylus ornithosphyos – type locality for species
 †Mesembrioxylon
 †Mesembrioxylon carterii – type locality for species
 †Mesodma
 †Mesodma formosa – or unidentified comparable form
 †Mesojassoides – type locality for genus
 †Mesojassoides gigantea – type locality for species
 †Mesolanistes
 †Mesolanistes reesidei
 †Metengonoceras
 †Metengonoceras dumbli
 †Metoicoceras
 †Metoicoceras geslinianum
 †Micrabacia
 †Micrabacia radiata
 †Micropycnodon
 †Micropycnodon kansasensis
 †Modiolus
 †Modiolus kremmlingensis – type locality for species
 †Modiolus meeki
 †Moremanoceras
 †Moremanoceras scotti
 †Morosaurus
 †Morosaurus laticollis – type locality for species
 †Morrolepis
 †Morrolepis schaefferi – type locality for species
 †Myledaphus
 †Myledaphus bipartitus
   †Mymoorapelta – type locality for genus
 †Mymoorapelta maysi – type locality for species
 Myrica
 †Myrica torreyi
 †Mytiloides
 †Mytiloides duplicostatus – or unidentified related form
 †Mytiloides latus – or unidentified comparable form
 †Mytiloides mytiloides
 †Mytiloides opalensis
 †Mytiloides stantoni – or unidentified comparable form
 †Mytiloides submytiloides – or unidentified related form

N

 †Nanosaurus – type locality for genus
 †Nanosaurus agilis – type locality for species
 †Nanosaurus rex
  Natica
 †Nemodon
 †Nemodon adkinsi
 †Nemodon harriesi – type locality for species
 †Neocardioceras
 †Neocardioceras densicostatum – type locality for species
 †Neocardioceras juddii
 †Neocardioceras laevigatum
 †Neocardioceras minutum
 †Neocardioceras uptonense
 †Neocrioceras
 †Neoptychites
 †Neoptychites cephalotus
 †Neurankylus
 †Nigericeras
 †Nigericeras scotti – type locality for species
 †Nonactaeonina
 †Nonactaeonina deflexa
 †Nonactaeonina triticea
 †Nortedelphys
 †Nortedelphys jasoni
  †Nostoceras
 †Nostoceras approximans – or unidentified comparable form
 †Nostoceras larimerense – type locality for species
 †Nostoceras monotuberculatum
 †Nostoceras obtusum – or unidentified comparable form
 †Nostoceras splendidum – or unidentified comparable form
  Nucula
 †Nucula percrassa
 Nuculana
 †Nymphalucina
 †Nymphalucina bourni – type locality for species
 †Nymphalucina cleburni

O

 †Octopodichnus
 †Odaxosaurus
 †Odaxosaurus piger
 †Oligoptycha
 †Oligoptycha concinna
 †Opertochasma
 †Opertochasma cuneatum
 †Opisthias
 †Opisthotriton
 †Opisthotriton kayi
  †Ornitholestes – tentative report
 †Ornithomimipus
 †Ornithomimipus angustus – or unidentified comparable form
  †Ornithomimus – type locality for genus
 †Ornithomimus velox – type locality for species
 Ostrea
 †Ostrea beloiti
 †Ostrea subradiata
 †Othnielia – tentative report
  †Othnielosaurus
 †Othnielosaurus consors
 †Oxybeloceras
 †Oxybeloceras crassum
 †Oxytoma

P

  †Pachycephalosaurus
 †Pachyrhizodus
 †Pachyrhizodus minimus
  †Palaeobalistum
 †Palaeopteryx – type locality for genus
 †Paleonelumbo
 †Paleonelumbo macroloba
  †Parabrontopodus – type locality for genus
 †Parabrontopodus mcintoshi – type locality for species
 †Parallelodon
 †Paramacellodus
 †Parapleurites
 †Parapleurites morrisonensis – type locality for species
 †Paressonodon – type locality for genus
 †Paressonodon nelsoni – type locality for species
 †Parikimys – type locality for genus
 †Parikimys carpenteri – type locality for species
 †Parviraptor
  †Pentaceratops
 †Pentaceratops sternbergii
 †Pentasauropus
 †Petropteron – type locality for genus
 †Petropteron mirandum – type locality for species
 †Phelopteria
 †Phelopteria linguaeformis
 †Phelopteria ruppii – type locality for species
 †Phlycticrioceras
 †Phlycticrioceras trinodosus
 †Pinna
 †Placenticeras
 †Placenticeras meeki
 †Placenticeras placentum
 †Placenticeras syrtale
 †Plastomenus – tentative report
 †Plastomenus insignis – type locality for species
 †Plastomenus punctulatus – type locality for species
 †Platanites
 †Platanites marginata
  †Platyceramus
 †Platyceramus ahsenensis
 †Platyceramus cycloides
 †Platyceramus mantelli - or unidentified loosely related form
 †Platyceramus platinus
 †Platyognathus
 †Plesiobaena
 †Plesiobaena antiqua – or unidentified comparable form
 †Polyonax – type locality for genus
 †Polyonax mortuarius – type locality for species
 †Preprismatoolithus
 †Preprismatoolithus coloradensis
 †Priacodon
 †Priacodon fruitaensis – type locality for species
 †Prionocyclus
 †Probaena
 †Probaena sculpta – type locality for species
  †Prognathodon
 †Prognathodon overtoni
 †Prognathodon stadtmani – type locality for species
  Propeamussium
 †Propeamussium simplicus
 †Protalphadon
 †Protexanites
 †Protexanites shoshonensis
 †Protocardia
 †Protocardia barneyi – type locality for species
 †Protocupressinoxylon
 †Protocupressinoxylon medlynii – type locality for species
  †Protosphyraena
 Prunus
 †Prunus corrugis
 †Pseudaspidoceras
 †Pseudaspidoceras collignoni
 †Pseudobaculites
 †Pseudocalycoceras
 †Pseudocalycoceras angolaense
 †Pseudocalycoceras dentonense
 †Pseudoisurus
 †Pseudoisurus tomosus – or unidentified comparable form
 †Pseudoperna
 †Pseudoperna bentonensis
 †Pseudoperna congesta
 †Pseudoperna inflatum – type locality for species
 †Pseudotetrasauropus – tentative report
 †Pteraichnus
  †Ptychodus
 †Ptychodus anonymus
 †Ptychodus decurrens
 †Ptychodus occidentalis
 †Ptychodus whipplei
 †Puebloites
 †Puebloites spiralis
 Pycnodonte
 †Pycnodonte newberryi

R

 †Rhaeboceras
 †Rhaeboceras coloradoense – type locality for species
 †Rhaeboceras halli
 †Rhaeboceras subglobosum
   Rhinobatos
 †Rhinobatos incertus
 †Rhynchosauroides
 †Rosselia
 †Rotodactylus

S

 †Sabalites
 †Sabalites JC016 – informal
 †Sabalites LA042 – informal
 †Saurillodon
 †Scapherpeton
 †Scapherpeton tectum
  †Scaphites
 †Scaphites binneyi
 †Scaphites depressus
 †Scaphites hippocrepis – or unidentified comparable form
 †Scaphites nodosus
 †Schadipes – type locality for genus
 †Schadipes crypticus – type locality for species
 †Sciponoceras
 †Sciponoceras gracile
 †Scoyenia
  †Selaginella
 †Selaginella JC023 – informal
  †Semionotus
 †Solenoceras
 †Solenoceras larimerense
 †Solenoceras reesidei – or unidentified comparable form
 †Solenoceras texanum
 †Sphenodiscus
 †Sphenodiscus pleurisepta
 †Spiroxybeloceras
 †Spiroxybeloceras meekanum
  Squalicorax
 †Squalicorax curvatus
 †Squalicorax falcatus
 †Squalicorax pristodontus
 †Squatirhina
 †Squatirhina americana
  †Stegosaurus – type locality for genus
 †Stegosaurus armatus – type locality for species
 †Stegosaurus stenops – type locality for species
 †Stegosaurus ungulatus
 †Steinerocaulis
 †Steinerocaulis radiatus
 †Stenomyti – type locality for genus
 †Stenomyti huangae – type locality for species
  †Stokesosaurus – or unidentified comparable form
 †Stramentum
 †Stramentum haworthi
 Sulcoretusa
 †Sulcoretusa dominici – type locality for species
 †Sumitomoceras
 †Sumitomoceras bentonianum
 †Sumitomoceras conlini
  †Supersaurus – type locality for genus
 †Supersaurus vivianae – type locality for species
 †Syncyclonema
 †Syncyclonema travisanus
 †Synorichthys – type locality for genus
 †Synorichthys stewarti – type locality for species

T

 †Tanaocrossus – type locality for genus
 †Tanaocrossus kalliokoskii – type locality for species
 †Tanocrossus
 Tellina
 †Tenea
 †Tenea parilis
 Teredo
 †Teredo irregularis
 †Texanites
 †Texanites americanus
  †Thalassomedon – type locality for genus
 †Thalassomedon hanningtoni – type locality for species
 †Theiophytalia – type locality for genus
 †Theiophytalia kerri – type locality for species
 †Therangospodus – or unidentified comparable form
 †Thescelosaurus
 †Tibiaporrhais
 †Tibiaporrhais cooperensis
 †Titanosaurus
 †Titanosaurus montanus – type locality for species
  †Torosaurus
 †Torosaurus latus
 †Torvosaurus – type locality for genus
 †Torvosaurus tanneri – type locality for species
 †Trachybaculites
 †Trachybaculites columna – or unidentified comparable form
 †Treptichnus
 †Triceratops
 †Triceratops galeus – type locality for species
 †Triceratops horridus
  †Trinacromerum – or unidentified comparable form
 Trochocyathus
 †Trochocyathus egerius
 †Turbinopsis
 Turritella
 †Turseodus
 †Turseodus dolorensis – type locality for species
  †Tylosaurus
 †Tylosaurus proriger
  †Tyrannosaurus
 †Tyrannosaurus rex

V

 †Vanikoropsis
 †Vanikoropsis nebrascensis
  †Vascoceras
 †Vascoceras birchbyi
 Viviparus
 †Viviparus reesidei
 †Volviceramus
 †Volviceramus grandis
 †Volviceramus involutus
 †Voysa

W

 †Walteria – type locality for genus
 †Walteria jeffersonensis – type locality for species
 †Walteria jeffersoni – type locality for species
 †Watinoceras
 †Watinoceras coloradoense – type locality for species
 †Websteria
 †Websteria cretacea
 †Worthoceras

X

 †Xenoxylon
 †Xenoxylon moorei – type locality for species
  †Xiphactinus
 †Xiphactinus audax

Z

 †Zyziphus
 †Zyziphus fibrillosus
 †Zyziphus LA007 – informal
 †Zyziphus LA032 – informal

References

 

Mesozoic
Colorado
Life
Colorado-related lists